Andrej Uspenski is a Russian ballet dancer and photographer.

Uspenski was born in St Petersburg and trained at the Vaganova Academy of Russian Ballet, the Palucca School of Dance, Dresden, and the Berlin State Ballet School. Uspenski joined The Royal Ballet in 2002 and rose to first artist, before retiring as a dancer in 2015, due to injury.

During his dancing career, he often photographed dancers and rehearsals and after retirement was asked to become an in-house photographer for the Royal Ballet. His first exhibition, A Dancer's View, was in 28 April to May 2017 at 
the Old Truman Brewery. The Royal Academy held a Friends private view of the exhibition.

He has published several photography books Dancers: Behind the Scenes with The Royal Ballet (2013), Natalia Osipova: Becoming a Swan (2013) and Steven McRae: Dancer in the Fast Lane (2014). British Theatre Guide called Dancers: Behind the Scenes with The Royal Ballet "indispensible to balletomanes". The Lady wrote that "the pictures have a rare intimacy" and gave it 4/5 stars.

Ballet News in its review of Steven McRae: Dancer in the Fast Lane mentions "Uspenski’s considerable skill in capturing moments of art".

Publications
Dancers: Behind the Scenes at The Royal Ballet, Oberon Books, 2013
Natalia Osipova: Becoming a Swan, 2013
Steven McRae: Dancer in the Fast Lane, 2014

Personal life
He had a relationship with Natalia Osipova.

In February 2018, Uspenski received a 12-month community order for "a campaign of harassment against an ex-girlfriend", ballet manager and former dancer Tatjana Novitjenko, including aggrevive messages, sending her a double-ended sex toy and a photo in which her Chihuahua appeared to be drowning in the Thames.

References

Dancers of The Royal Ballet
Living people
Dancers from Saint Petersburg
Russian male ballet dancers
Russian photographers
21st-century Russian ballet dancers
Year of birth missing (living people)